Así Es is the debut studio album by Chilean singer Américo. His version of "El Embrujo" received high demand on Chilean radio. The album was certified Platinum for selling more than 10,000 copies.

Track listing

References

Américo albums
2008 debut albums